Insook Bhushan (born Na In-Sook, February 17, 1952) is a South Korea-born American table tennis player. She was a member of the South Korean women's team that won the bronze medal at the 1971 World Championships. At the 1973 World Championships, she was limited to the role of "non-playing captain" of the gold medal-winning South Korean women's team. In 1974, she emigrated to the United States, where her father had established an import-export business. The following year, she married the architect Shekhar Bhushan and in 1980 became a US citizen.

Between 1976 and 1991, Bhushan dominated the US National Championships, winning the title in women's singles 11 times, women's doubles 11 times, and mixed doubles 8 times. In 1977, she won the women's singles title at the US Open.

Bhushan returned to her birthplace for the 1988 Olympics, where she competed in women's singles and women's doubles. She also competed in women's singles at the 1992 Olympics and represented the United States in 6 World Championships. She participated in 3 Pan American Games, winning 8 gold medals (including 3 consecutive gold medals in women's singles) and 1 silver medal.

Bhushan retired from competition after the 1992 Olympics and was inducted into the USATT Hall of Fame in 1993.

Bhushan has a degree in accounting from the University of Colorado Denver and works as an accountant in the Colorado Department of Military and Veterans Affairs. She has two sons, Austin (born in 1980) and Kevin (born in 1985).

References

Other sources

External links
 
 

1952 births
Living people
American female table tennis players
Olympic table tennis players of the United States
Table tennis players at the 1992 Summer Olympics
Table tennis players at the 1988 Summer Olympics
Pan American Games medalists in table tennis
Pan American Games gold medalists for the United States
Pan American Games silver medalists for the United States
Table tennis players at the 1983 Pan American Games
Table tennis players at the 1987 Pan American Games
Table tennis players at the 1991 Pan American Games
Medalists at the 1983 Pan American Games
Medalists at the 1987 Pan American Games
Medalists at the 1991 Pan American Games
21st-century American women